Florida Gulf Coast University is a census-designated place (CDP) and the official name for an area covering the Florida Gulf Coast University campus, in Lee County, Florida, United States. 

It was first listed as CDP in 2020. Per the 2020 Census, the population was 3,659.

Demographics

2020 census

References

Census-designated places in Lee County, Florida